Gandhian socialism is the branch of socialism based on the national interpretation of the theories of Mahatma Gandhi. Gandhian socialism generally centers on Hind Swaraj or Indian Home Rule authored by Gandhi. 

Federation of political and economical power and demonstrating a traditionalist reluctance towards the modernisation of technology and large scale industrialisation whilst emphasising self-employment and self-reliance are key features of Gandhian socialism.

Atal Bihari Vajpayee of the culturally right-wing Bharatiya Janata Party (BJP), and other party leaders incorporated Gandhian socialism as one of the concepts for the party.

Etymology
The ideology of Gandhian socialism is rooted in Gandhi's work titled Swaraj and India of My Dreams in which, he describes Indian society, with no one rich or poor, no class conflict, where there is an equal distribution of the resources, and self-sufficient economy without any exploitation and violence. Thus, Gandhian socialism differed from Western socialism because the latter believed in material progress whereas Gandhi considered every one materially equal. As Jawahar Lal Nehru puts in his biography, "he suspects also socialism, and more particularly Marxism, because of their association with violence." He believed his style of socialism came from the strong beliefs he held in non-violence and not those adopted from any books. Many experts observed that, similar to other schools of socialism, Gandhi's concept of socialism was a result of ethical considerations, but had nothing to do with class-consciousness as professed by the western socialism. There was also a religious aspect of Gandhi's socialism. To understand Gandhi's socialist philosophy, as Romain Rolland observed; "it should be realized that his doctrine is like a huge edifice composed of two different floors or grades. Below is the solid groundwork, the basic foundation of religion. On this vast and unshakable foundation is based the political and social campaign."

Economic philosophy
The key aspects of the economic policies of Gandhian socialism are based on ethics. According to Gandhi: "Economics that hurts the moral well-being of a human or a nation is immoral and, therefore sinful". Hence, Gandhian socialism roots for economic social justice by promoting equality for all. Evolving from this ideology, the economic components of Gandhian socialism are centered around Swaraj, resulting from complete economic freedom. This is achieved through self-sufficiency and self-reliance, where, everyone gets an appropriate share of his labor. Therefore, Gandhian socialism advocates a society without economic classes, which Gandhi termed it as Sarvodaya. An example of this concept can be seen in the implementation of Panchayat Raj in India. In 1938, during the formulation of an economic plan for the post-independent India, it was noted that the planning under a democratic India should be based not only on raising the standard of living by copying various socialist, capitalist, or a fascist nation's plan, but it should be centered towards its roots firm in Indian soil and India's problems.

See also
 Gandhian economics

Further reading
 Shourie, Arun (1990). Individuals, institutions, processes: How one may strengthen the other in India today. New Delhi, India: Viking. 
 Swarup, Ram (1955). Gandhism and communism: Principles and technique. New Delhi: J. Prakashan.

References

Bibliography
 
 
 

Bharatiya Janata Party
Eponymous political ideologies
Hindutva
Indian political philosophy
Paternalistic conservatism
Socialism in India
Types of socialism